Robert McSkimming (29 May 1885 – 22 December 1952) was a Scottish footballer who played for clubs including Albion Rovers (two spells), The Wednesday, Motherwell (on a long-term loan during World War I) and Helensburgh, as a centre half.

McSkimming was selected to play for Scotland in an unofficial international in 1918.

He emigrated to New Zealand in the 1920s; another branch of the family had done so several decades earlier, including cousin Peter McSkimming who was a noted politician and businessman.

References

1885 births
1952 deaths
Sportspeople from Lanark
Footballers from South Lanarkshire
Association football defenders
Scottish footballers
Wishaw Thistle F.C. players
Albion Rovers F.C. players
Motherwell F.C. players
Helensburgh F.C. players
Sheffield Wednesday F.C. players
Scottish Football League players
English Football League players
Scottish Junior Football Association players
Scotland wartime international footballers
Scottish emigrants to New Zealand